Robert Harold Brown (October 16, 1938 – February 5, 1997) was a Canadian professional wrestler, better known by his ring name "Bulldog" Bob Brown.

Early life 
Brown was born in Shoal Lake, Manitoba, but grew up in the St. James-Assiniboia area of Winnipeg. He was given the nickname "Bulldog" in grade school. Brown worked as a police officer before becoming a professional wrestler.

Professional wrestling career 
Having worked as a policeman in Manitoba, Brown also played hockey. He started wrestling in 1962 in Manitoba and eventually worked in New Brunswick and Alberta as a smart alec heel. In interviews he often argued about the events that had happened by turning the facts around. From 1969–1974 and in the early 1980s, Brown wrestled for NWA All Star Wrestling in Vancouver and formed tag teams with Gene Kiniski and John Quinn. In New Brunswick in the mid 1970s he fought Leo Burke and Stephen Petitpas. He also made appearances in Kansas City and St. Louis against Harley Race, Bruiser Brody and Marty Jannetty.

Brown wrestled for NWA Central States where he won the Central States heavyweight and tag team titles. He often worked as booker for the Central States and several other promotions.

Brown wrestled for Stampede Wrestling where he won the Stampede International Tag Team Championship, alongside Kerry Brown, who was billed as Brown's son, but was actually his nephew. The pair defeated Chris Benoit and Biff Wellington for the championship on June 9, 1989. That same year, Brown began working as the color commentator for Stampede's television show, alongside Ed Whalen. Brown retired from wrestling after a 37-year career in 1994, following a heart attack.  He worked briefly for WWF as a referee.

Personal life and death 
Brown's brother Doug is a wrestling promoter, and his son David worked as a professional wrestling referee under the name David Puttnam. Brown was the uncle of Kerry Brown, who was a professional wrestler.

In 1996, Brown suffered a heart attack, and was pronounced dead twice before being revived. This caused him to retire from in-ring competition. Following his retirement, he worked as a security guard (along with Rufus R. Jones - another professional wrestler) at a horse and dog racing track in Kansas City, Kansas and the formally named Flamingo Casino, now known as Isle of Capri Casino in Kansas City, Missouri until his death on February 5, 1997.

Championships and accomplishments 
Atlantic Grand Prix Wrestling
AGPW North American Tag Team Championship (3 times) – with Great Pogo Langie (1), Rick Valentine (1), and Masa Chono (1)
Central States Wrestling
NWA Central States Heavyweight Championship (19 times)
NWA Central States Tag Team Championship (12 times) – with Gama Singh (1), Dick Murdoch (1), Pat O'Connor (1), Rufus R. Jones (1), Terry Taylor (1), Buzz Tyler (3), Marty Jannetty (1), Mitsuo Hata (2), and the Cuban Assassin (1)
NWA North American Tag Team Championship (Central States version) (5 times) – with Bob Geigel
NWA United States Heavyweight Championship (Central States version) (1 time)
NWA World Tag Team Championship (Central States version) (3 times) – with Al Hayes (1), Alexis Smirnoff (1), and Bob Sweetan (1)
NWA Heart of America Championship (1 time)
NWA Iowa Tag Team Championship (1 time) - with Ripper Jack Daniels
Eastern Sports Association
ESA International Tag Team Championship (1 time) – with The Patriot
ESA North American Heavyweight Championship (1 time)
Madison Wrestling Club
MWC Heavyweight Championship (7 times)
MWC Tag Team Championship (4 times) – with John DePaulo (1), Bill Kochen (2), and Lorne Corlett (1)
NWA All-Star Wrestling
NWA Canadian Tag Team Championship (Vancouver version) (8 times) – with Dutch Savage (2), John Quinn (3), Gene Kiniski (2), and Al Tomko (1)
NWA International Tag Team Championship (Vancouver version) (1 time) – with Buzz Tyler
NWA Pacific Coast Heavyweight Championship (Vancouver version) (3 times)
Stampede Wrestling
NWA International Tag Team Championship (Calgary version) (1 time) – with Kerry Brown
World Wrestling Council
WWC World Tag Team Championship (1 time) - with Dale Veasey
WWC North American Tag Team Championship (1 time) - with Dale Veasey
West Four Wrestling Alliance
WFWA Canadian Heavyweight Championship (1 time)

References

External links 

 
 

1938 births
1997 deaths
20th-century professional wrestlers
Burials at Brookside Cemetery (Winnipeg)
Canadian expatriate professional wrestlers in the United States
Canadian male professional wrestlers
Professional wrestlers from Manitoba
Stampede Wrestling International Tag Team Champions